Nasiah Wanganeen-Milera (born 22 February 2003) is a professional Australian rules footballer playing for the St Kilda Football Club in the Australian Football League (AFL). He was drafted in the 2021 AFL Draft at pick number 11 overall.

Early life 
He is the nephew of former Port Adelaide and Essendon legend Gavin Wanganeen, and the stepson of former St Kilda player Terry Milera.

In his draft year of 2021, Wanganeen-Milera played for grand finalists Glenelg in the SANFL, playing four games in the seniors and the remainder in the reserves. He averaged 15.8 disposals, 3.9 marks, 2.5 tackles and 2.4 inside 50s in 13 games for the reserves side. In his four senior games he averaged 11 disposals and three marks. Wanganeen-Milera helped the Tigers reserves claim the Reserves premiership, kicking a goal and gathering 19 touches in the Grand Final win over Central Districts.  Wanganeen-Milera was also selected for the NAB AFL Academy team as well as the South Australian U18 team to compete at the National Championships.

AFL career 
Wanganeen-Milera was selected with St Kilda's first pick in the 2021 AFL draft, at number 11 overall. Wanganeen-Milera made his 'debut' as an unused medical substitute in Round One 2022 against Collingwood. He made his on-field debut a week later against Fremantle, having 13 disposals.

Statistics
 Statistics are correct to the end of round 7, 2022

|- style="background:#eaeaea;"
! scope="row" style="text-align:center" | 2022
| style="text-align:center" | 
| 7 || 7 || 0 || 3 || 65 || 22 || 87 || 25 || 10 || 0.0 || 0.4 || 9.3 || 3.1 || 12.4 || 3.6 || 1.4 || TBA
|- class="sortbottom"
! colspan=3| Career
! 7
! 0
! 3
! 65
! 22
! 87
! 25
! 10
! 0.0
! 0.4
! 9.3
! 3.1
! 12.4
! 3.6
! 1.4
! TBA
|}

Notes

References

External links

Living people
2003 births
St Kilda Football Club players
Australian rules footballers from South Australia